Wanly is an Egyptian surname. Notable people with the surname include:

 Adham Wanly (1908–1959), Egyptian painter
 Seif Wanly (1906–1979), Egyptian painter